Andrew C. Hecht, M.D., is an American orthopaedic surgeon and a nationally recognized leader in surgery on the spine.

Hecht serves as the spine surgical consultant to the New York Jets, the New York Islanders and the New York Dragons, as well as collegiate teams at Hofstra University and Molloy College, and is the Chief of Spine Surgery for the Mount Sinai Health System and Chief of Spine Surgery at The Mount Sinai Hospital, Director of the Mount Sinai Spine Center of Mount Sinai Doctors, the Faculty Practice and Associate Professor of Orthopaedic Surgery and Neurologic Surgery at the Icahn School of Medicine at Mount Sinai, both in New York City.

Hecht was selected for New York Magazine'''s “Top Doctors” and as one of Castle Connolly's Top Doctors for the New York Metro Area for Orthopaedic Spine Surgery and Castle Connolly's “Top Doctors in America” for Orthopaedic Spine Surgery. He was elected as “Top Physician” to The New York Times'' Super Doctors and Best Doctors in America.

Hecht is the author of numerous original peer-reviewed articles, abstracts, invited contributions, multiple books and book chapters and is a contributing author to the Interactive Educational Program for Spine. He recently contributed and edited an issue of Seminars in Spine Surgery dedicated to Spine Injuries in Athletes. He directs the acute spine and spinal cord injury program for the New York Jets and routinely cares for athletes who sustain spine injuries.

Biography
Hecht was born in New York City in 1967. He graduated magna cum laude from Brown University in 1989 and earned his M.D. with magna cum laude honors at Harvard Medical School in 1994. His postdoctoral training includes an internship in general surgery at New England Deaconess Hospital and the Harvard Combined Orthopaedic Surgery Residency Program at Massachusetts General Hospital, Brigham and Women's Hospital and the Beth Israel Deaconess Medical Center, which he completed in 1991. He then completed a fellowship at the Emory University Spine Center.

In 2001, Hecht served as Instructor of Orthopaedic Surgery at Harvard Medical School. That same year, Hecht founded the Newton-Wellesley Spine Center and served as it medical co-director. In 2002, he served as Director of the Spine Surgery Fellowship at Massachusetts General Hospital. In 2003, he joined Mount Sinai Medical Center as Chief of Spine Surgery and Assistant Professor of Orthopaedic Surgery.

Hecht is a member of the North American Spine Society, the Cervical Spine Research Society and the American Academy of Orthopaedic Surgeons and serves on the medical board of trustees at the  Musculoskeletal Transplant Foundation. Additionally, he serves on the faculty of numerous courses and meetings to teach spine surgeons the latest clinical advances and surgical techniques. He serves on the editorial board of the Journal of Spinal Disorders and Techniques and sits on the Publications Committee for the American Academy of Orthopaedic Surgeons and founded and directed a course at Mount Sinai Medical Center to educate primary care doctors about musculoskeletal disorders. He lectures nationally and internationally on spine surgery.

Hecht's clinical interests include cervical and lumbar spine surgery, the evaluation and surgical management of degenerative disorders of the cervical, thoracic and lumbar spine, minimally invasive spinal surgery, microsurgery, spine trauma and tumors. Research areas include cervical and lumbar spine surgery and intervertebral disc biology.

Honors and awards
2010 Guest Speaker, 10th annual meeting of Advanced Technologies in Spinal Treatment, Tokyo, Japan
2010 New York Magazine's Top Doctors
2010 Castle Connolly, Top Doctors in America, 9th Edition
2009-2015 New York Times “Super Doctor”
2009, 2010 Best Doctors (USA)
2008-2010 Castle Connolly, Top Doctors for the New York Metro Area, 10th, 11th & 12th Editions
2004 Visiting professor, University of Michigan, Department of Orthopedic Surgery
2002 Robert Bayley Osgood Award for Best Basic Science Paper/Thesis Harvard Combined Residency Program
1999 Orthopaedic Research and Education Foundation Grant
1994 Magna cum laude, Harvard Medical School
1993 Howard Hughes Medical Merit Scholarship Award for Outstanding Research
1993 Howard Hughes Medical Institute Research Fellowship
1993 Soma Weiss Research Fellow, Harvard Medical School
1990 NIH Summer Research Training Fellowship
1989 Magna cum laude, Brown University
1988 Eleven academic high distinction notations
1988 Appointed Meiklejohn Academic Fellow, Brown University

Books and chapters
Hecht AC, Leon SP, Kelly RA, and Lilly LS: Cardiovascular Drugs, Pathophysiology of Heart Disease, Lea & Febiger: Philadelphia & London, 1992, pp. 272–305 Outlook/Perspectives in Colon & Rectal Surgery, 5(6):4-6, 1992
Hecht AC, Silcox HD, Whitesides TE: Injuries to the Cervicoranium, Skeletal Trauma: Fractures, Dislocations and Ligamentous Injuries, Ed. Browner B, Jupiter JB, Levine, A and Trafton P, WB Saunders Company: Philadelphia, 2003
Hecht AC, Boden SD: Biology of Spine Fusion, in Advanced Spinal Surgical Technologies, ed. Corbin T, Connolly P, Yuan H, Bao Q, Boden SD, Quality Medical Publishing: St Louis
Hecht AC, Scott D, Critchlow R, Pedlow FX:  Treatment of Metastatic Disease of the Spine, Adult and Pediatric Spine, 3rd edition, ed. Frymoyer J, Lippincott Williams & Wilkins, pp. 247–289, 2004
Scott D, Hornicek FJ, Hecht AC, and Pedlow FX, in Treatment of Primary Sarcomas of the Spine, Adult and Pediatric Spine, 3rd edition, ed. Frymoyer J, Lippincott Williams and Wilkins, pp. 191–247, 2004
Qureshi S, Hecht AC: Epidemiology of Spinal Cord Injury, Atlas of Spine Trauma: Adult and Pediatric, ed. Kim DH, Ludwig SC, Vaccaro A, Elsevier, 2008
Chen, M, Qureshi S, Hecht AC: Anterior Thoracic Corpectomy, Operative Techniques in Orthopaedic Surgery, ed. Weisel S, Lippincott Williams and Wilkins, in print.
Qureshi S, Hecht AC: Anterior approach to the thoracic spine, Operative Techniques in Orthopaedic Surgery, ed. Weisel S, Lippincott Williams and Wilkins, in print.
Boden SD, Bostrom PG, Haydon R, Hecht AC, Kirkpatrick J, Lee FY, Leet A, Levine W, McKellop HA, Miclau T, Nelson F, Parvizi J, Sherma PJ, Wright TM, Orthopaedic Basic Science Self Assessment Examination, American Academy of Orthopaedic Surgery, 2006

Publications
Towle CA, Wright M, Hecht AC, Kuong SJ, Papanicolas LE, Totkovic R, Mankin HJ, Treadwell BV: A Matrix Metalloproteinase Proenzyme Activator Produced by Articular Cartilage, Biochem Biophys Res Commun, 247(2):324-331, 1998 
Snyder BD, Hauser-Kara DA, Hipp JA, Zurakowski D, Hecht AC, Gebhardt MC:   Predicting fracture through benign skeletal lesions with quantitative computed tomography, J Bone Joint Surg Am 2006, 88(1): 55- 70 
Hecht AC,  Degradative Enzyme Systems in Articular Cartilage: Purification, Characterization and  Role in Cartilage Degradation of a Novel Serine Protease Isolated from Bovine Articular Cartilage.  Thesis, 1994 (awarded magna cum laude Harvard Medical School)
Hecht AC, Silcox H, and Heller JG:  A biomechanical and clinical study of transarticular screw fixation with onlay bone grafting. (to be submitted to Spine 2008)
Lewandrowski KU, Hecht AC, Delaney TF, Chapman PA, Hornieck FJ, and Pedlow FX.  Anterior spinal arthrodesis with structural cortical allografts and instrumentation for spine tumor surgery, Spine, 29(10):1150-1159, 2004 
Hecht AC, Chen M and Jenkins A:  Minimally Invasive approach for far lateral disc herniations at L5-S1:  A novel technique and report of 2 patients,  Journal of Spinal Disorders and Techniques,  (submitted to Journal of Spinal Disorders and Techniques, 2008)
Taitsman LA, Altman DT, Hecht AC, and Pedlow FX.   Complications of Cervical Halo-Vest Orthoses in Elderly Patients, Orthopedics, 31(5):446, 2008 
Singh H, Hecht AC, and Jenkins AL, Novel Fluoroscopic Technique for Localization at Cervicothoracic Levels,  Journal of Spinal Disorders and Techniques, 22(8):615-8 
Koehler SM, Lin JD, Stets KC, Qureshi SA, Martins DA and Hecht AC: Case Report: Lumbar Spinous Process Avulsion Fracture  in an Adolescent Dancer, Clinical Journal of Sport Medicine, 20(3):213-4, 2010 
Koehler SM, Beasley MB, Chin CS, Wittig JC, Hecht AC, Qureshi SA, Synovial Sarcoma of the Thoracic Spine, Spine Journal, Dec 9(12):el-6,   2009 
Hecht AC, Koehler SM, Laudone JC, Jenkins AJ, Qureshi SA, Is Intraoperative CT of Posterior Cervical Spine Instrumentation Cost Effective and Does it Reduce Complications, Clinical Orthopaedics  And Related Research,  October 2010 
Bronson WH, Koehler SM, Qureshi SA, and Hecht AC, Importance of plain film radiography in the evaluation of low back pain and radiculopathy due to recurrent lumbar disc herniation, Orthopaedics, 12:33(5), 2010

References

External links
The Mount Sinai Hospital homepage
Icahn School of Medicine at Mount Sinai homepage

1967 births
Brown University alumni
Harvard Medical School alumni
Living people
Icahn School of Medicine at Mount Sinai faculty
American orthopedic surgeons